Weatherhouse is the second album by the English musician Philip Selway, released on 7 October 2014.  It features musicians Selway's backing band.  On 31 July 2014 a music video was released for the first single from the album, "Coming Up for Air".  On 22 September 2014 a music video was released for another song on the album, "It Will End In Tears". Whereas Selway's first album, Familial (2010), was largely acoustic, Weatherhouse features more ambitious arrangements and electronic elements.

Critical reception

Weatherhouse received a score of 65 on Metacritic, indicating "generably favourable reviews".  AllMusic gave the album three and a half out of 5, declaring it "an immaculately crafted, impossibly tasteful miniature". NME also gave it three and a half, writing that it showed that Selway was " a compelling artist in his own right" and shared elements with his work with Radiohead.

Track listing

Personnel
Personnel adapted from Weatherhouse liner notes.

Musicians
 Phil Selway – vocals, guitar, drums, percussion, drum machine
 Adem Ilhan – guitar, bass guitar, drum machine, marimba, programming, vocals, engineering, production
 Quinta – clavichord, Fender Rhodes, marimba, Mellotron, musical saw, hammond organ, percussion, piano, viola, violin, vocals, production

The Elysian Quartet
 Jennymay Logan – violin
 Emma Smith – violin
 Vince Sipprell – viola
 Laura Moody – cello

Production
 Ted Dewan – artwork, sleeve design
 Graeme Stewart – engineering
 Marta Salogni – engineering
 David Wrench – mixing
 Mandy Parnell – mastering

References

2014 albums
Philip Selway albums
Bella Union albums